The 2021 Coastal Carolina Chanticleers baseball team represented Coastal Carolina University during the 2021 NCAA Division I baseball season. The Chanticleers played their home games at Springs Brooks Stadium and were led by twenty-fifth year head coach Gary Gilmore. They were members of the Sun Belt Conference.

Preseason

Signing Day Recruits

Sun Belt Conference Coaches Poll
The Sun Belt Conference Coaches Poll was released on February 15, 2021 and the Chanticleers were picked to finish first in the East Division with 69 votes and first overall in the conference with 10 votes.

Preseason All-Sun Belt Team & Honors
Aaron Funk (LR, Pitcher)
Jordan Jackson (GASO, Pitcher)
Conor Angel (LA, Pitcher)
Wyatt Divis (UTA, Pitcher)
Lance Johnson (TROY, Pitcher)
Caleb Bartolero (TROY, Catcher)
William Sullivan (TROY, 1st Base)
Luke Drumheller (APP, 2nd Base)
Drew Frederic (TROY, Shortstop)
Cooper Weiss (CCU, 3rd Base)
Ethan Wilson (USA, Outfielder)
Parker Chavers (CCU, Outfielder)
Rigsby Mosley (TROY, Outfielder)
Eilan Merejo (GSU, Designated Hitter)
Andrew Beesly (ULM, Utility)

Roster

Coaching staff

Schedule and results

Schedule Source:
*Rankings are based on the team's current ranking in the D1Baseball poll.

Posteason

Conference Accolades 
Player of the Year: Mason McWhorter – GASO
Pitcher of the Year: Hayden Arnold – LR
Freshman of the Year: Garrett Gainous – TROY
Newcomer of the Year: Drake Osborn – LA
Coach of the Year: Mark Calvi – USA

All Conference First Team
Connor Cooke (LA)
Hayden Arnold (LR)
Carlos Tavera (UTA)
Nick Jones (GASO)
Drake Osborn (LA)
Robbie Young (APP)
Luke Drumheller (APP)
Drew Frederic (TROY)
Ben Klutts (ARST)
Mason McWhorter (GASO)
Logan Cerny (TROY)
Ethan Wilson (USA)
Cameron Jones (GSU)
Ben Fitzgerald (LA)

All Conference Second Team
JoJo Booker (USA)
Tyler Tuthill (APP)
Jeremy Lee (USA)
Aaron Barkley (LR)
BT Riopelle (CCU)
Dylan Paul (UTA)
Travis Washburn (ULM)
Eric Brown (CCU)
Grant Schulz (ULM)
Tyler Duncan (ARST)
Parker Chavers (CCU)
Josh Smith (GSU)
Andrew Miller (UTA)
Noah Ledford (GASO)

References:

Rankings

References

Coastal Carolina
Coastal Carolina Chanticleers baseball seasons
Coastal Carolina Chanticleers baseball